Sri Ram Nallamani Yadava Educational Institutions is offering undergraduate and postgraduate courses in the field of arts and science, teacher training and pharmacy. It is situated at Nallamani Nagar, Tenkasi Taluk, Tirunelveli district, Tamil Nadu, India. Thiru. N. Nallamani Konar is founder of this college. It is run by Dr. Manimaran. and his family 

Colleges in Tamil Nadu